The Kolkata Suburban Railway (colloquially called Kolkata local trains or simply locals) is a suburban rail system serving the Kolkata metropolitan area and its surroundings in India. It is the largest suburban railway network in the country with the highest number of stations. It is also the 7th largest suburban rail system in the world. There are five main lines and nineteen branch lines. The suburban railway operates more than 1,500 services, carrying 3.5 million people daily and 1.2 billion people every year. It runs from 03:00 am until 02:00 am and the fares range from Rs.5 to Rs.25. The system uses  power supply and runs on  broad gauge track. It has interchange stations with the Kolkata Metro at various locations.

The Kolkata Suburban Railway is part of the second passenger railway constructed in British India during the mid 19th century. The first train ran between Howrah and Hooghly stations. A hundred years after the initial run, Electric Multiple Unit (EMU) services began.

The system is operated by two zones of Indian Railways; the Eastern Railway zone and the South Eastern Railway zone. These zones are further divided into the Howrah and Sealdah divisions for the Eastern Railway and the Kharagpur division for the South Eastern Railway. Howrah, Sealdah and Kolkata railway stations are the three major terminals serving the network in the city. Shalimar and Santragachi are also the termini stations for mail/express trains as well as passenger/fast passenger trains.

History

The Kolkata Suburban Railway is an offshoot of the second passenger railway to be built by the British in India. The first train ran between Howrah and Hooghly stations on 15 August 1854 and was operated by the East Indian Railway (EIR). Regular services on the  line were introduced on the same day, with stops at Bally, Serampore and Chandannagore stations. The broad gauge Sheoraphuli–Tarakeswar branch line was opened by the Tarkessur Railway Company on 1 January 1885.

In 1951, all the railway companies, zone and divisions were integrated and recategorized. This led to the formation of the Eastern Railway (ER) and South Eastern Railway (SER) zones. These zones of Indian Railways currently operate the Kolkata Suburban Railway.

Eastern Railway zone 

The Eastern Railway zone was formed on 14 April, 1952, by the amalgamation of the East Indian Railway Company and the entire Bengal – Nagpur Railway (later it formed the SER). It has four divisions; Howrah and Sealdah divisions operate the system. The Sealdah division was part of the Eastern Bengal Railway before the recategorisation. Howrah division is the oldest in the ER zone.

On 1 February, 1957, the EMU services were introduced on the Howrah – Bandel section of the Howrah division. In 1963, services were gradually extended to Barddhaman and on the Sealdah Division of Eastern Railway were introduced on the Sealdah – Ranaghat route. In 1968, the Howrah – Barddhaman main and chord line was totally converted to  power supply from a 3000 V DC power supply. Howrah–Sheoraphuli–Tarakeswar line was electrified in 1957–58.

South Eastern Railway zone 

The Bengal Nagpur Railway (BNR) Company was incorporated in 1887 to take over from the Nagpur Chhattisgarh Railway (NCR) and to convert the line to broad gauge. The work was completed in 1888. The extension of the main line from Nagpur to Asansol was completed by 1891. Later, it formed the Eastern Railway zone. On 1 August, 1955, the former Bengal Nagpur Railway portion was separated and a new zone, the South Eastern Railway (SER), came into existence. The SER comprises four divisions, and Kharagpur is the only division to operate the suburban railway.

In the SER zone, EMU service made its maiden run on 1 May, 1968 between Howrah – Mecheda of the Kharagpur division, and on 1 February, 1969, EMU services were extended to Kharagpur. Gradually the services were extended to eight other lines by 2003. The system under this zone was completely electrified by 1968.

Network

Kolkata is the smallest of India's six A-1 cities in terms of area. However, the Kolkata Suburban Railway is the largest suburban railway network in India by track length and number of stations. The system is operated by two zonal divisions (under Indian Railways), Eastern Railways (ER) and South Eastern Railways (SER). The fast commuter rail corridors on Eastern Railway as well as South Eastern Railway are shared with long-distance and freight trains, while inner suburban services operate on exclusive parallel tracks. SER operates the South Eastern Line and ER operates the Eastern Line, Circular Line, Chord link Line as well as the Sealdah South lines.

Junction stations are marked in bold

Lines

South Eastern line

The South Eastern line in Kolkata consists of three major corridors, which divide into two branches as they run into the suburban satellite towns. The mainline bifurcates (splits) into two branch lines—the Panskura–Haldia line at Panskura Junction  to the south-east—and the Santragachi–Amta line at Santragachi Junction  to the north. These corridors constitute the 'main' South Eastern line.

The South Eastern line has one interchange station with the Eastern Line at Howrah Junction. Rolling stock consists of a fleet of AC as well as dual-powered AC/DC EMUs. The major car sheds on this line are at Tikiapara and Panskura.

On 6 September 2009, then Railway Minister, Mamata Banerjee announced the introduction of Ladies Special local trains, namely Matribhumi (i.e. motherland), in the Kolkata suburban section. The first local Matribhumi Special local ran from Howrah to Kharagpur.

Eastern line

The Eastern line in Kolkata, the largest network of the Kolkata Suburban Railway, consists of two divisions—Howrah and Sealdah divisions (named after their respective terminals)—which serve both sides of the Hooghly River. 

In the Howrah division of the Eastern line, there are five corridors, which also bifurcates and runs into the northwestern suburbs. The first two corridors are the  Howrah–Bardhaman main line and the  chord line. Kamarkundu now this line has been extended to Goghat from Tarakeswar as Tarakeswar - Bishnupur branch, under Tarakeswar - Bishnupur rail project.

On the other side of the river, the Sealdah division of the Eastern line has seven corridors, splitting into branch lines to serve the northeastern suburbs.

The major car sheds (depots) on this line are at Howrah Jn and Bandel on the Howrah division and at Narkeldanga, Barasat and Ranaghat in the Sealdah division.

Sealdah division's first Matribhumi local started in October 2018; it was the first all-women passenger train in Indian Railway history. It had female motormen, guards, and security personnel. On 24 August 2015, train services were halted between the Barasat and Bangaon line after a protest by a group of passengers obstructed movement of the trains. They demanded that male passengers be allowed to travel on the Matribhumi ladies special trains. This occurred when Eastern Railway withdrew the decision to allow male passengers to travel on Matribhumi local.

Circular Railway

The Circular Railway corridor encircles the inner city neighbourhoods of Kolkata. From Dum Dum Junction to Tala, the line is double-tracked, while from Tala to Majerhat, the line is single-tracked. Running by the side of the Hooghly River from Tala to Majerhat, it joins and runs parallel to the Sealdah South tracks after Majerhat and elevates at Park Circus in order to bypass Sealdah (which is a terminal station). After bypassing Sealdah, it rejoins the mainline at Bidhannagar Road and again terminating at Dum Dum Jn. The line is also known as Chakra Rail.

The circular line is a point of interest for tourists. As it runs under Howrah Bridge, Vidyasagar Setu and runs parallel to the Hooghly River, connecting multiple tourist places and ghats it provides access to a scenic view for daily commuters and visitors.

Sealdah South lines

The Sealdah South line is an important link to Sundarbans in West Bengal from Kolkata. It is also part of the Eastern Railway. This line has four corridors, and bifurcates as branch lines linking the southern suburbs to Kolkata. The main line is double-tracked until Lakshmikantapur railway station and single-tracked from Lakshmikantapur to Namkhana. This line has a sole depot at Sonarpur.

This line has three interchange stations, at Majerhat and Park Circus with Circular Railway and at Sealdah for Eastern line.

Chord link line

The Chord link line connects Sealdah to Dankuni Junction on the Howrah–Barddhaman Chord. This line plays an important role in connecting the Sealdah Division's mainline with the Howrah–Bardhaman chord, which is primarily used by freight and passenger trains heading towards North India(The Howrah–Bardhaman chord is part of the Howrah–Delhi mainline and the Grand Chord). The Chord link crosses the Hooghly River on the Vivekananda Setu road-rail bridge.

This corridor has a famous tourist spot, the Dakshineswar Kali Temple, where Ramakrishna Paramhansa served as a priest. It also includes the road-cum-rail bridge, Vivekananda Setu, also known as the Bally Bridge.

It has three interchange stations. Interchange is possible at Dum Dum Junction for the Eastern line (Sealdah–Gede mainline), at Dankuni Junction for the Eastern line (Howrah–Barddhaman Chord) and at Bally Halt (lying above Bally station) for the Eastern Line (Howrah–Barddhaman mainline). The extension of the Kolkata Metro Line 1 runs parallel to this line, and will have interchange facilities at Dum Dum, Baranagar and Dakshineswhar stations.

Expansion
A new line is under construction between Amta and Bagnan with a length of  under the jurisdiction of the South Eastern Railway sanctioned in 2010–11. Another new line is in progress between the Dakshinbari and Tarakeswar with joint work by the ER and SER.

It extends to Sagar Island on the Hooghly River delta. The island can only be reached by boat; expansion of this line is a boon for the people of island providing better connectivity.

Operations

Services and security 
Three types of local train services are operated. They are normal locals, trains which stop at every station; galloping locals, these trains have limited stops and skip the smaller stations; and women-only trains known as Matribhoomi local.

The Railway Protection Force (RPF) and Government Railway Police (GRP) are responsible for the security of Kolkata Suburban Railway. The major stations in Kolkata also have closed-circuit cameras.

Travel classes 
There are three travel classes:
Class II: These are regular compartments, where anyone can travel. The last rows on both ends of the compartment are reserved for physically challenged and senior citizens.
Class L: These compartments are exclusively reserved for women. Men are not allowed in them. The second compartment from both ends is for ladies.
Vendor: These are for vendors to transport heavy goods and luggage. The compartments have seats along the walls and are made to haul goods. The third compartment from both ends is for vendors.

Ridership 
During 2010–11, there was an average of 1,275 trains per day. The average passenger capacity per rake was 6,207. In 2014–15, the average number of trains was 1,511 with an average passenger capacity per rake of 4,141. In the last five years, there was an increase of three percent in the average number of trains per day and reduction of eright percent in the average number of passengers per rake.

Fares and ticketing 
In the 2013 Railway Budget, the Railway Board increased the Kolkata suburban ticket fare by eight paise per kilometre, although the railway ministry has hiked it by two paise per kilometre. The number of slabs has also been reduced to four—,  and —from the eight slabs earlier. One can buy a monthly, quarterly or season ticket if commuting regularly on a particular route. This allows unlimited rides on that route. Season tickets are the most cost-effective and time-efficient option for regular commuters.

Kolkata Suburban Railway uses a proof-of-payment fare collection system. Tickets can be bought for a single journey (one way) or a return journey. Travelling without a valid ticket is an offence and if caught can result in a penalty.

Offline tickets can be bought from the unreserved ticket counters present at every station and Cash/Smart Card operated Ticket Vending Machines (CoTVM) and Automatic Ticket Vending Machines (ATVM) installed in most of the stations. One can issue online tickets using the UTSOnMobile app.

Non-suburban routes
Some routes do not have any regular EMU services and therefore bypass the Kolkata Suburban Railway Network. To connect people on these routes, passenger trains run to help transport people from small towns and villages to the Kolkata Metropolitan Area and vice versa. There are two routes that bypass the Kolkata Suburban Railway and are not connected to any other network.

Infrastructure

Rolling stock
The Electric Multiple Units (EMUs) for the Kolkata suburban services were built domestically at the Integral Coach Factory (ICF), Perambur; the first EMU rolled out in September 1962.
 
The Howrah division of Eastern Railways has a rolling stock of 12-coach EMUs made by Jessop, ICF and Titagarh Wagons. BEML EMU's have been purchased and are in use. A few Unique BEML stainless steel EMUs are also in service. A small fleet of 12-coach Siemens EMUs are also in service. MEMU Rakes from the Rail Coach Factory, Kapurthala (RCF) and Diesel multiple units (DEMUs)) from the ICF are in service. Howrah division has 61 12-car rakes. The Sealdah division has rolling stock including nine and 12-coach EMUs, also made by Jessop, ICF and Titagarh Wagons. A small fleet of Siemens 12-coach EMUs is also in service. BEML EMU's have been purchased and are in use and a small number of unique BEML stainless steel EMUs are also in service. DEMU trains made by ICF and MEMU from Rail Coach Factory, Kapurthala (RCF) are in service. The number of 9-car and 12-car EMU rakes Sealdah division are 49 and 66 respectively. There are 2 Mainline Electric Multiple Unit (MEMU) rakes also.

The South Eastern Railways uses 12-coach EMUs made by Jessop, Siemens, Titagarh Wagons and ICF. BEML EMUs have been purchased and are in use. A few unique BEML stainless steel EMUs are also in service. SER was the first Division in West Bengal to use the ICF Medha 3-phase rakes. DEMU rakes from ICF and MEMU from RCF are in service. In February 2018, SER launched Medha ICF Rakes on the Howrah–Kharagpur route and on 15 April 2018, Eastern Railway also started using them on the Howrah–Bandel Route. SER has 30 12-car EMU rakes.

Every division of the Kolkata Suburban Railway are rapidly replacing their old Jessop and ICF EMUs with the latest Medha 3-phase EMU rakes made by ICF with Bombardier Transportation. Almost all the EMU Units used by the Kolkata Suburban Railway are equipped with a GPS-based passenger information system. Some EMUs, which were previously in service with the Western Line of the Mumbai Suburban Railway, were later shifted to Kolkata for service.

Electrification and gauge 

The Howrah to Bardhaman section of Eastern Railway, got equipped with 3000 V DC electrification by 1958. Following the research and trials by SNCF in Europe, Indian Railways decided to adopt 25 kV AC system as a standard in 1957, as it was found more economical, and by 1968 the mainlines of both zones were electrified with 25 kV AC traction. Branch lines and other lines were gradually electrified later. On 5 January 2015, the Kalinarayanpur to Krishnagar City Junction route via Shantipur was totally converted into electrified broad gauge from meter gauge with three phases, Phase-I was from Krishnanagar City Junction to Shantipur Junction which was commissioned on 7 February 2012; Phase II was from Shantipur Junction to Phulia which was commissioned on 30 January 2014; and the last, Phase III, for Phulia to Kalinarayanpur was commissioned and later EMU services begun. On 12 January 2018, the Barddhaman to Katwa line was totally converted to electrified broad gauge from narrow gauge with two phases—Phase-I Barddhaman to Balgona and Phase-II Balgona To Katwa began to be converted beginning on 30 May 2012. Currently, the network has a 25 kV overhead catenary electrification system, with  Indian broad gauge tracks.

Signalling and telecommunication 

An Electronic Interlocking signalling system is most widely used, replacing the old lever frames/panel interlockings system. To increase sectional capacity and efficiency, automatic signalling is being used. This is controlled by AC/DC track circuits, axle counters etc. The axle counter system is used to detect the presence of a train in an absolute block section, point zone area of a station and level crossings.

An optical fibre communication system is the backbone of the telecommunications network. The telecommunications facility is an omnibus circuit between stations and the central control hub at Sealdah and Howrah. For ground based mobile communication, Mobile Train Radio Communication (MTRC) is used.

Incidents
In the early 1980s, down Kalyani Simanta local overshot the down starter signal at Kalyani rail station and rammed into up Krishnagar City local which was coming into pf. 1 from the opposite direction. Eye-witnesses say the 'head' of the down local hit the 'belly' of the up local. Several coaches derailed, and passengers sustained injuries as both trains were going slow (10kmph). Services on the mainline were suspended for a few days and the derailed rakes kept laying in Kalyani outers for several months. 

Two local trains (Sealdah– EMU local and Shantipur–Sealdah EMU local) collided on the same track at  railway station on 7 January 2012. One person was killed and several were injured. Three coaches of both trains derailed.

On 12 December 2013, an accident was averted as two trains arrived on the same line at Sealdah Station. The driver of the Sealdah–Lalgola passenger train which left from platform seven had overshot the starter signal and entered the down main line but stopped because of the Bangaon–Sealdah local, which was coming from the opposite direction. This was reported to the control room and the passenger train was hauled back to platform seven of Sealdah Station.

Fourteen passengers were injured when an explosion took place inside a compartment of the Sealdah–Krishnanagar local train early on the morning of 12 May 2015. Train services along the Sealdah Section were normal. However, two trains were cancelled as train movement was affected following the incident.

On 17 November 2015, a 40-year-old man, who had boarded the Howrah–Bandel Matribhumi special local for women only, fell off the train and died between Uttarpara and Hind Motor stations. This incident occurred when the man boarded the train. Some female commuters surrounded and abused him. He was eventually forced to get off the train. When the man realized a station was approaching, he ran to grab the handle but missed it and fell from the train to his death.

On 19 July 2017, a train from Sonarpur Jn to Sealdah (South) Station broke the buffer and hit the wall of platform number 13 in Sealdah (South) Station. This incident happened in the morning around 10:25 am (IST).

After the collapse, Eastern Railways suspended train services via Majerhat railway station on the Kolkata Circular Railway and Sealdah-Budge Budge lines temporarily.

This incident happened at night. According to locals and daily passengers, the foot over-bridge was in bad condition due to lack of maintenance.

There was a stampede on a foot over-bridge at  railway station in West Bengal on 23 October 2018. Two people died and twelve others were injured, including two children and two women. This incident occurred because of the arrival of two trains at the same time. People rushed to board the trains and that created a stampede-like situation on the bridge.

On 2 October 2019, A local train coming from Masagram was derailed, when it was entering on Platform no.6 of Howrah railway station. No casualties were reported. This incident happened around 8:10 pm (IST).

On 15 March 2020, a massive fire broke out in the Salimpur slum area which lies near the  railway station track at around 8:30 am. No casualties were reported. After this incident, Sealdah South lines were suspended temporarily.

See also
Eastern Bengal Railway
Bengal Nagpur Railway
Trams in Kolkata
Transport in Kolkata
Mumbai Suburban Railway
Delhi Suburban Railway
Chennai Suburban Railway
Bengaluru Commuter Rail
Hyderabad Multi-Modal Transport System
List of suburban and commuter rail systems

References

External links

 South Eastern Railway
 Eastern Railway
 Kolkata Suburban Railway timetable

 
1854 establishments in British India
Rail transport in Howrah
Transport in Kolkata
Rail transport in Kolkata
Eastern Railway zone
Indian companies established in 1854
Railway companies established in 1854
South Eastern Railway zone